Al-Hayʼat al-ʿUlyā lil-Jāmiʿāt al-Qawmiyyah Bangladesh is the government-recognized combined Qawmi Madrasah Education Board of Bangladesh, having the authority to arrange central examinations and to issue certificates. It consists of six Qawmi Madrasah Education Boards: Befaqul Madarisil Arabia Bangladesh, Befaqul Madarisil Qawmia Gauhordanga Bangladesh, Anjumane Ittehadul Madaris Bangladesh, Azad Deeni Edaraye Talim Bangladesh, Tanjeemul Madarisid Diniya Bangladesh, and Jatiya Deeni Madrasa Shikkha Board Bangladesh.

Background
Prime Minister Sheikh Hasina announced on 11 April 2017 that, on the basis of the principles of the Darul Uloom Deoband, a Dawra-e-Hadith certificate issued by a Qawmi Madrasah would be treated as equivalent to a master's degree in Islamic studies and Arabic. Two days later the Ministry of Education published a gazette elaborating on the decision. It gave a committee formed by the Qawmi Madrasah boards the authority to supervise the Dawrah-e-Hadith examinations.

On 19 September 2018, parliament passed a bill putting the decision into law, retrospective to April 2017. It recognized Al-Haiatul Ulya Lil-Jamiatil Qawmia Bangladesh as a board that integrates the six existing Qawmi Madrasa education boards: Befaqul Madarisil Arabia Bangladesh, Befaqul Madarisil Qawmia Gauhordanga Bangladesh, Anjumane Ittehadul Madaris Bangladesh, Azad Deeni Edaraye Talim Bangladesh, Tanjeemul Madarisid Diniya Bangladesh and Jatiya Deeni Madrasa Shikkha Board Bangladesh. The chairman of Befaqul Madarisil Arabia Bangladesh will be the ex officio chairman of the combined board.

Objectives and functions
The Haiatul Ulya was founded to ensure a standardized curriculum and to provide centralized examinations for all of the institutions under six Qawmi Madrsa Education Board, and hence to be able to get government recognition. The main functions of the federation are: creation of syllabus, checking standard of education, arrangement of examination and issuance of degrees.

Notable institutions
The following are some of the notable Qawmi Madrasahs in Bangladesh:
 Al-Jamiatul Ahlia Darul Ulum Moinul Islam
 Jamia Tawakkulia Renga Madrasah
 Jamiatul Uloom Al-Islamia Lalkhan Bazar - also known as Lalkhan Bazar Madrasah
 Jamia Qurania Arabia Lalbagh
 Al-Jamiah Al-Islamiah Patiya
 Jamia Shariyyah Malibagh, Dhaka
 Jamia Rahmania Arabia Dhaka
 Jamia Darul Ma'arif Al-Islamia
 Jamia nuria islamia bharthokhola, sylhet

See also 
 List of Deobandi organisations
 Bangladesh Madrasah Education Board
 Dars-i-Nizami
 Education in Bangladesh
 Hefazat-e-Islam Bangladesh
 Islam in Bangladesh
 Religious education

References

Further reading
 
 

Qawmi madrasas of Bangladesh
Deobandi Islamic universities and colleges
Deobandi organisations